JCI may refer to:

 Jakarta Composite Index of Indonesia Stock Exchange (see JSX Composite)
 JCI Limited or Johannesburg Consolidated Investment Company Limited, formed in 1889 and later split into Anglo American Platinum, Johnnic, and JCI Gold
 Johnson Controls Inc., a producer of automotive systems, automotive batteries and climate control systems
 Joint Commission International, a US-based organization for healthcare accreditation
 Journal citation indicator, a measure of academic journal influence
 Journal of Clinical Investigation, a journal that publishes biomedical research and reviews
 Journal of Controversial Ideas, an academic journal
 Junior Chamber International, a worldwide community of young active citizens
 Juventud Comunista Ibérica, (Iberian Communist Youth),  youth wing of the Iberian Communist Federation